Arctocorisa is a genus of true bugs belonging to the family Corixidae.

The species of this genus are found in Europe and Northern America.

Species:
 Arctocorisa carinata (Sahlberg, 1819) 
 Arctocorisa chanceae Hungerford, 1926

References

Corixidae